Medicine Trail is the third solo album by country rock / bluegrass musician Peter Rowan. Guest musicians include Jerry Douglas, Ricky Skaggs, David Grisman, Mike Auldridge, Flaco Jimenez, and Peter's brother Lorin Rowan.

Track listing
"Riding High in Texas"  (Peter Rowan) - 3:38
"My Foolish Pride"  (Peter Rowan) - 3:04
"River of Stone"  (Peter Rowan) - 6:05
"Revelation"  (Peter Rowan) - 4:17
"Living on the Line"  (Peter Rowan) - 2:54
"Medicine Trail"  (Peter Rowan) - 4:59
"Blues Come Bother Me"  (Peter Rowan) - 4:24
"Dreaming I Love You"  (Peter Rowan) - 4:23
"Maui Mama"  (Peter Rowan) - 4:21
"Prairie Lullabye"  (Jimmie Rodgers / George Brown) - 4:49

Personnel
Peter Rowan - guitar, mandolin, vocals
Lorin Rowan - guitar, piano, vocals
David Grisman - mandolin, organ, piano
Ricky Skaggs - guitar
Mike Auldridge - dobro
Jerry Douglas - dobro
Jimmy Fuller - steel guitar
Hugo Gonzales - banjo
Flaco Jimenez - accordion
Ozzie Ahlers - piano, vocals
Roger Mason - bass, vocals
Oscar Tellez - banjo, bajo sexto, 6-string bass
Alan Hand - clarinet, piano
Baird Banner - drums
Isaac Garcia - drums
Jon Sholle - guitar
Estrella Berosini - vocals
Maria Muldaur - vocals
Buck White - vocals
Cheryl White - vocals
Sharon White - vocals

Production
Producer: Peter Rowan
Recording Engineer: Baird Banner/Bill Mackleroy/Marius Peron/Paul Wyckliffe
Mixing: Brett Cohen/Roger Mason/Paul Wyckliffe
Mastering: Kevin Gray
Photography: Lisa Law
Artwork/Lettering: Greg Irons

Peter Rowan albums
1980 albums